The 2017 Canadian Mixed Doubles Curling Championship were held from April 5 to April 9 at the Nutana Curling Club in Saskatoon, Saskatchewan.

Teams
The teams are listed as follows:

Provincial and Territorial champions

Open entries

Round robin standings

Draw 1
Wednesday, April 5, 5:30 pm

Draw 2
Wednesday, April 5, 8:30 pm

Draw 3
Thursday, April 6, 8:30 am

Draw 4
Thursday, April 6, 11:30 am

Draw 5
Thursday, April 6, 2:30 pm

Draw 6
Thursday, April 6, 5:30 pm

Draw 7
Thursday, April 6, 8:30 pm

Draw 8
Friday, April 7, 8:30 am

Draw 9
Friday, April 7, 11:30 am

Draw 10
Friday, April 7, 4:30 pm

Draw 11
Friday, April 7, 7:30 pm

Draw 12
Friday, April 7, 10:30 pm

Draw 13
Saturday, April 8, 10:30 am

Draw 14
Saturday, April 8, 1:30 pm

Tiebreakers
Saturday, April 8, 4:00 pm

Saturday, April 8, 6:00 pm

Saturday, April 8, 8:00 pm

Playoffs

Round of 12
Saturday, April 8, 9:00 pm

Quarterfinals
Sunday, April 9, 10:00 am

Semifinals
Sunday, April 9, 2:00 pm

Final
Sunday, April 9, 5:00 pm

References

External links

Canadian Mixed Doubles Curling Championship
2017 in Canadian curling
Curling in Saskatoon
2017 in Saskatchewan
April 2017 sports events in Canada